St Famianus of Compostela (1090–1150) was a Catholic Saint.

Biography 
Famianus was born on 1090 to a wealthy family. However, he left his wealthy life and gave all of his property to the poor. Afterwards, he lived the life of a poor pilgrim. During this time period, he visited many Christian holy sites in Italy and Spain, including Rome. He eventually joined a Cistercian monastery at Osera de Ebro in Spain. He went to the Holy Land in 1146. He died in Italy.

Citations 

1090 births
1150 deaths
Catholic saints
People from Cologne